Media Forest is an Israeli service provider of Monitoring and Media Research for Music and AdvertiIndustries, founded in 2005 in Netanya, Israel. The company monitors broadcasting tracks and channels such as radio stations and TV channels, and accordingly, provides added-value content and information services. The company provides subscription services through Internet interfaces that track content (mentions, commercials, speech, performances) and provide real time information to artists, media companies, and publishers.

Since founding Media Forest, the company has established regional franchise owners operating in France, Argentina, Moldova, Belgium, Bulgaria, Romania, Greece, and Switzerland. In Romania, Media Forest provided data for the country's national Airplay 100 chart.

Weekly charts
Media Forest publishes an airplay charts once a week, every Sunday. The airplay charts contain data generated by the Media Forest system according to any song played during the period starting the previous Sunday at time 00:00:00 and ending Saturday night at 23:59:59.

The weekly chart was published by Mako, and actually in the official website.

Media Forest publishes charts for several countries. For Romania's, see:
List of Media Forest most-broadcast songs of 2009 in Romania
List of Media Forest most-broadcast songs of the 2010s in Romania
List of Media Forest most-broadcast songs of the 2020s in Romania

Media Music Awards
The Media Music Awards is an annual awards gala organized in Romania based on radio and television airplay data compiled by Media Forest.

References

External links
 

Music industry associations
Record charts
Music organizations based in Israel
Romanian music